Albert Puig Ortoneda (born 15 April 1968) is a Spanish footballer manager He is the current manager J1 League club of FC Tokyo.

Managerial statistics

References

1968 births
Living people
Spanish football managers
Albirex Niigata managers
FC Tokyo managers
Spanish expatriate sportspeople in Japan
Expatriate football managers in Japan
J1 League managers
J2 League managers